Focus on the Important or just Focus is a minor political party in Croatia. It was founded by independent politicians and entrepreneurs from the Zagreb County area.

History
The First President of the party is Davor Nađi, at the time deputy mayor of Sveta Nedelja (previously a member for Croatian People's Party – Liberal Democrats, HNS–LD). The party elected Ivan Gulam, mayor of Pirovac (also formerly of HNS–LD), as Deputy Leader, and Dario Vrbaslija, president of the Slatina town council (ran locally as an independent, before that a member of Croatian Democratic Union, HDZ), as party Vice President.

Focus first participated in the 2020 Croatian parliamentary elections in coalition with SIP (led by Dalija Orešković) and Pametno, with the alliance winning three seats in the Sabor, one each. The candidate elected from the Focus list was Dario Zurovec, mayor of Sveta Nedjelja, in District VII. Since December 2020, his seat is occupied by party leader Davor Nađi, who acts as deputy representative.

The party also participated in the 2021 Croatian local elections, winning the mayoralties of Sveta Nedelja, Pirovac, and Križ in the first round.

Political program
The basic messages that the party advocates with its program are:
Lower taxes (with the model used in Estonia given as an example) and regulatory burdens.
Fewer employees in the government administration with increased efficiency, transparency and the introduction of digital transformation.
Adapting to climate change through the concept of a green economy based on innovation and investments in infrastructure.

Election results

Legislative

See also 
 List of members of Croatian Parliament, 2020–

References

External links

Modern history of Croatia
Political parties established in 2020
Political parties in Croatia
2020 establishments in Croatia
Classical liberal parties